I Want You is a 1998 English crime film directed by Michael Winterbottom.

Plot
Martin is an ex-convict who returns home and finds that Helen, his former girlfriend, is involved with someone else. Despite this, he pursues her.

Cast
Rachel Weisz as Helen
Alessandro Nivola as Martin
Luka Petrušić as Honda
Labina Mitevska as Smokey
Ben Daniels as Bob
Carmen Ejogo as Amber

Awards and nominations
Berlin Film Festival
1998: Won, "Special Mention" - Sławomir Idziak
1998: Nominated, "Golden Berlin Bear Award" - Michael Winterbottom

Camerimage
1998: Nominated, "Golden Frog Award" - Slawomir Idziak

Valladolid International Film Festival
1998: Won, "Youth Jury Award" - Michael Winterbottom

References

External links

 

1998 films
1990s English-language films
1998 crime drama films
Films directed by Michael Winterbottom
British romantic musical films
British crime drama films
PolyGram Filmed Entertainment films
Gramercy Pictures films
1990s British films
Films about disability